The Kurdistan Region–PKK conflict is a series of battles and clashes in Iraqi Kurdistan between the Kurdistan Regional Government against the Kurdistan Workers' Party (PKK) and its allied groups. It started in 1983 and is still ongoing. The PKK's primary method is using guerrilla warfare against the Peshmerga.

History 
The PKK and the Peshmerga, both the KDP and PUK wings, have fought against each other many times until today. When the PKK was founded in 1978, its actions were mostly just in Turkey, however when a coup took place in the eighties which heavily cracked down on the PKK, its fighters fled to Syria and Iraq, what is now the Iraqi Kurdistan Region. Initially, the PKK convinced the KDP, which ruled most of Iraqi Kurdistan, to sign a deal in 1983 allowing the PKK to control over some areas bordering Turkey. However, relations between the KDP and PKK went downhill when the PKK began demanding governance in the Kurdistan Regional Government and more territorial control in KDP-ruled areas as it kept fighting Turkey and wanted more influence in the Kurdistan Region.

During the Iraqi Kurdish Civil War, Iran and Turkey, as well as Iranian, Iraqi, American forces were drawn into the fighting. On good terms with the PUK at the time, the PKK began attacking KDP Peshmerga and members of the KDP. The PKK was moved to Qandil Mountains from Beqaa Valley after the war ended. The worst fighting of the entire Kurdish civil war started on October 13, 1997. Hundreds were killed and thousands were displaced. Turkey backed the KDP, due to them both trying to push PKK out of Iraqi Kurdistan. Turkey even intervened on the side of the KDP and saw it as an opportunity to attack the PKK. Turkey also warned the PUK to stop cooperating with the PKK. On September 25, 1997, Turkish forces launched Operation Dawn. They had the goal of forming a ceasefire between the KDP and PUK while destroying PKK camps. The operation resulted in heavy PKK and Turkish casualties, but Turkey once again failed to push out the PKK from northern Iraq. A cease-fire was negotiated between the PUK and KDP, which the PUK began opposing the PKK. The PUK's Jalal Talabani would later warn the PKK to "disarm or leave Iraq".

Saddam Hussein had openly supported the PKK and PJAK as a way to counter Turkey and Iran in the past. Some Kurds accused the PKK of working as a mercenary in favor of Saddam's regime, a way to counter Kurdish rebels, and as a spy agency against the Turkish state for the benefit of the Iraqi Ba'ath regime. A spokesman for the Iraqi Foreign Ministry stated that the PKK was a "tragic legacy from the Saddam regime" The PKK was also accused of "continuing Saddam Hussein's policy" by a Duhok politician.

In 2000, after Ocalan's arrest, the PKK and PUK had a major clash. The PKK later left the cities and began only being active in the rural areas doing ambushes. On 3 separate occasions on July 29, 2015, October 28, 2020, and January 18, 2022, the PKK attacked the KRG-Turkey oil pipeline. In 2014, the Peshmerga abandoned a piece of land on the mountains of Zini Warte in Erbil so that they can go fight ISIS southwards. The PKK later took that piece of land. The KDP deployed its Peshmerga forces back to the area in 2020 and took it back. Masoud Barzani accused the PKK of taking advantage of the Peshmerga's conflict with ISIS in order to “invade” parts of the Kurdistan Region bordering Turkey, “instead of supporting the Kurdistan Region experiment.” On June 5, 2021, the PKK ambushed 5 Peshmerga soldiers in Duhok, killing them. According to the KRG, the PKK had occupied 515 villages in the Kurdistan Region as of 2015. Of these, 304 come under Duhok province, while 177 were in Erbil and 34 in Sulaymaniyah. In a statement on February 27, 2021, Masoud Barzani emphasized that the Kurdish authorities could not rebuild 800 villages because of the PKK, adding they would not tolerate the group's presence in the region.

On 20 May 2014, the KDP arrested many PÇDK members during operations in Erbil, Duhok, and Zakho. A few days before the operation, the Kurdistan Regional Government banned the PÇDK after they protested in front of the Kurdistan Region Parliament to commemorate a massacre of PKK members by the KDP in Erbil in 1997, during the Iraqi Kurdish Civil War.

During the 2022 Sinjar clashes, the KRG and the PKK backed different sides.

In 2022, the Deputy Minister of Peshmerga, Sarbast Lazgin released a statement to the Kurdistan 24 channel, saying that "some of Iraq's PMF, the Government of Syria, and the Lebanese Hezbollah are allied with PKK, they support each other and work together toward the same goals. This alliance has an open route all the way from Syria, through Sinjar, Mosul, Kirkuk, and to Iran, which is under control of PMF, The PKK has military bases near Chamchamal District, Sulaymaniyah Governorate, from where they cooperate with the groups that launch rockets on Erbil, We, the KRG, have repeatedly called on the PKK to stop its armed operations in the Kurdistan Region." He also stated that the PKK fighting has no impact on Turkey, and all it does is drag the Turkish Army deeper into the Kurdistan Region.

A representative of the Kurdistan Regional Government to the Iraqi Armed Forces, Command General Abdul-Khaliq Talaat, stated that “Sinjar will not be stable as long as the PKK and the other outlawed armed militias stay there" and he called on the Iraqi government to work with the KRG in order to remove the PKK.

References 

Conflicts in 1983
History of the Kurdistan Workers' Party
Iraqi Kurdistan
 
1978
Wars involving Turkey
Wars involving the Peshmerga
20th-century conflicts
21st-century conflicts
1980s conflicts
1990s conflicts
2000s conflicts
2010s conflicts
2020s conflicts

tr:Kürdistan Bölgesel Yönetimi-PKK çatışması